Central Hungary is one of the seven statistical regions in Hungary (NUTS 1 and NUTS 2).

Administration 

Central Hungary's subregions (population figures from the Hungarian Central Statistical Office as of 2009)





Demography
 Total population 2,925,500 (2009)
 14% aged 0–14 years
 69% aged 15–64 years
 17% aged 65 and over

Economy
Central Hungary is the richest and most developed region of the country. The unemployment rate stood at 2.7% in 2017 and was much lower than the national and the european average.

Tourism
Central Hungary is part of the Budapest Central Transdanubia Tourist Region.

Budapest

In 1987 a World Heritage Site was declared which includes Buda Castle, the Danube Riverbank, the Andrássy Avenue and its historic surroundings, the Millennium Underground Railway and Heroes' Square.

Other important landmarks in Buda are the Gellért Hill and the tomb of Gül Baba and Rudas Baths built during the Ottoman rule of Hungary, ruins of Old Buda, the Coliseum in Nagyszombat Street and the ruins of Aquincum. In the Buda Hills are the Chairlift, the Children's railway and caves with stalagmites and stalactites.

The most important landmarks in Pest are the Hungarian Parliament Building, the St. Stephen's Basilica, the Inner City Parish Church, the Hungarian Academy of Sciences, the Vigadó Concert Hall, the Hungarian National Museum, the New York Palace on the Small Boulevard, the Dohány Street Synagogue, the Grand Boulevard, and the Museum of Applied Arts.

Other important displays are at the Museum of Fine Arts, the Hungarian National Gallery,  the Ethnographic Museum, the Budapest History Museum and Statue Park.

Important landmarks are Budapest's oldest bridges, such as the Széchenyi Chain Bridge, the Margaret Bridge, the Liberty Bridge. The biggest parks are very popular, especially the City Park with Vajdahunyad Castle, the Széchenyi thermal bath, the Budapest Zoo and Botanical Garden and the Margaret Island. Budapest is world-famous for its hot spas too.

Budapest holds many perennial events, for example Budapest Fair, Fireworks and Budapest Parade.

Other landmarks are the church (built in the Middle Ages) in Zsámbék, the Reformed church of the Holy Roman Empire, the church in Fót in the Romantic style, Apaj plain, ancient juniper fields in Tatárszentgyörgy,  equestrianism in Pusztavacs, Attila Rise in Tápiószentmárton, the arboretum in Vácrátót and the bear sanctuary in Veresegyház.

The Pilis Mountains offer plenty of opportunities for hiking. There are also the Visegrád Hills, Ördögmalom waterfall, Gödöllő National Park and Ócsa National Park.

See also
List of regions of Hungary

References

External links

 
NUTS 1 statistical regions of the European Union
NUTS 2 statistical regions of the European Union